Dale Anderson may refer to:

Dale Anderson (boxer) (born 1953), Canadian boxer
Dale Anderson (footballer) (born 1970), English football forward
Dale Anderson (ice hockey) (1932–2015), Canadian ice hockey defencemen
Dale Anderson (politician) (1916–1996), American politician
Dale Anderson (sportsman) (born 1931), Australian rules footballer and First-class cricketer
Dale A. Anderson, American aerospace engineer